Ascent or The Ascent may refer to:

Publications
 Ascent (magazine), an independent, not-for-profit magazine 
 Ascent (journal), a literary journal based at Concordia College
 Ascent (novel), by Jed Mercurio
 Times Ascent, a weekly supplement of The Times of India newspaper

Film and TV
 The Ascent (1977 film), a Soviet film set in World War II
 The Ascent (1994 film), an American war adventure film
 Kodiyettam (Ascent), 1977 Indian film written and directed by Adoor Gopalakrishnan
 "The Ascent" (Star Trek: Deep Space Nine), a 1996 episode of the television series Star Trek: Deep Space Nine
 "Ascent" (American Crime Story), an episode of the second season of American Crime Story
 "Ascent" (Dead Zone), an episode of The Dead Zone

Music
 Ascents (album), 2000 album by Dennis Bayne Culp
 The Ascent (Wiley album), 2013 album by rapper Wiley
 The Ascent (Secrets album), 2012 debut album by post hardcore band Secrets

Business
 Ascent Solar, a solar power company in the United States
 Ascent Media, a holding company
 The Ascent at Roebling's Bridge, a residential building in Covington, Kentucky
 Subaru Ascent, an SUV

Other uses
 Ascent (aeronautics) or climb, increasing the altitude of an aircraft
 The Ascent (video game), an action role-playing video game
 Ascent propulsion system, a rocket engine
 Colorado Springs Ascent, a defunct American soccer team
 Ascent (font), the distance between the baseline and the top of a glyph in typeface

See also 
 Ascend (disambiguation)
 Accent (disambiguation)